Jalan Tanjung Dawai (Kedah State Road 161) is a major road to Tanjung Dawai in Kedah, Malaysia. It connects Singkir to Tanjung Dawai.

Junctions and towns

Roads in Kedah